The Graf-Anton-Guenther School is a Gymnasium in Oldenburg, Lower-Saxony, established in 1920. Over 1600 students attend the school in the City of Oldenburg. The school is named after the last Count of Oldenburg Anthony Günther (German: Anton Günther). Headmaster is Wolfgang Schoedel. About 110 teachers are employed at the school.

External links
Graf-Anton-Guenther School Webpage

Buildings and structures in Oldenburg (city)
Schools in Lower Saxony
Educational institutions established in 1920
1920 establishments in Germany